Iowa Highway 37 (Iowa 37) is an east–west road in the west-central part of the state. Iowa 37 begins just east of Turin at Iowa Highway 175. A small portion of the highway near Turin is designated as part of the Loess Hills Scenic Byway.

Route description

Iowa Highway 37 begins at an intersection with Iowa 175 east of Turin and adjacent to Iowa 175's crossing of the Maple River. The first  of the route are part of the Loess Hills Scenic Byway. The highway travels east and then southeast through the Loess Hills, a region of dunes east of the Missouri River created by wind-deposited silt from the Missouri River valley. At Soldier, Iowa 37 exits the Loess Hills and meets Iowa 183. From Soldier, the highway travels  to the southeast to Dunlap. Eastbound Iowa 37 overlaps westbound US 30; this phenomenon is known as a wrong-way concurrency. At Earling, the highway intersects the northern end of Iowa 191.

History
Originally, Iowa Highway 37 began at US 75 in Onawa to US 59 east of Earling. The westernmost  of the route were overlapped by Iowa 175. In 1966, Iowa 37 was truncated to its current western end near the Maple River. In 1971, a new section of US 59 was opened  to the west of the former alignment. In 1980, the section east of US 59 was turned over to Shelby County.

Major intersections

References

External links

End of Iowa 37 at Iowa Highway Ends.

037
Transportation in Monona County, Iowa
Transportation in Crawford County, Iowa
Transportation in Harrison County, Iowa
Transportation in Shelby County, Iowa